Hawkcombe Woods is a national nature reserve near Porlock on Exmoor, Somerset, England.

The  woodlands are notable for their lichens, heath fritillary butterfly, red wood ant colonies, dead wood invertebrates and ancient pollards.

They are part of the North Exmoor Site of Special Scientific Interest.

Hawkcombe head 
Hawkcombe head is a Mesolithic flint working site.  Radiocarbon dating of flint tools and charcoal shows the site was occupied between 6390 and 6210 BC. The possible site of a building with hearths has been identified through archaeological excavation.

References

Forests and woodlands of Somerset
Exmoor
National nature reserves in Somerset